Blondie in the Dough is a 1947 American comedy film directed by Abby Berlin and starring Penny Singleton, Arthur Lake, Larry Simms, and Marjorie Ann Mutchie. It is 21st of the 28 Blondie films.

Plot
Dagwood and his boss are frantically searching for an eccentric cookie tycoon in order to sign him to a contract. Unknown to them, Blondie has already met him and the man is enjoying himself making cookies in Blondie's kitchen while Dagwood is at work.

Cast
 Penny Singleton as Blondie
 Arthur Lake as Dagwood
 Larry Simms as Baby Dumpling
 Marjorie Ann Mutchie as Cookie
 Daisy as Daisy the Dog
 Jerome Cowan as George Radcliffe
 Hugh Herbert as Llewellyn Simmons
 Clarence Kolb as J.T. Thorpe
 Danny Mummert as Alvin Fuddle
 William Forrest as Bob Dixon
 Eddie Acuff as Mr. Beasley
 Norman Phillips Jr. as Ollie Shaw
 Kernan Cripps as Harry Baxter
 Fred F. Sears as Quinn
 Alyn Lockwood as Mary

References

External links
 
 
 
 

1947 films
Columbia Pictures films
American black-and-white films
1947 comedy films
Blondie (film series) films
American comedy films
Films directed by Abby Berlin
1940s American films